Vigo is a small unincorporated community in Prairie Creek Township, Vigo County, in the U.S. state of Indiana. The community is in the 47802 zip code, the Wabash Valley and the Terre Haute Metropolitan Statistical Area.

History
A post office was established at Vigo in 1844, and remained in operation until it was discontinued in 1905.

Geography

References

Unincorporated communities in Vigo County, Indiana
Terre Haute metropolitan area
Unincorporated communities in Indiana